Homer Central High School is a grades 9-12 high school which is part of the Homer Central School District in Homer, New York. The current principal is Douglas VanEtten with Jim McGory appointed as vice principal. Tammy Reed is the administrative secretary. The school mascot is a Trojan warrior.

Homer Central High School traces its history back to 1819, when it was known as Cortland Academy.

Homer Central High School has a total of 1,951 students as of 2017-2018

References

Public high schools in New York (state)
Schools in Cortland County, New York